Edward Charles was an author.

Edward Charles is also the name of:
Ned Charles (born 1957), Mauritian footballer
Ed Charles (1933–2018), football player

See also